Ugra Narasimham is a 1986 Telugu-language action drama film written, directed and produced by Dasari Narayana Rao under Tharaka Prabhu Films banner. The film stars Krishnam Raju, Jaya Prada and Mohan Babu. The music was composed by Chellapilla Satyam.

Cast
Krishnam Raju as Balaraju
Jaya Prada as Jyothi
Mohan Babu as Lawyer in the climax court scene
Jaggayya as Chakravarthy
Giri Babu as Giri
Allu Ramalingaiah as Lingayya
J.V. Somayajulu as Balaraju's grandfather
Dasari Narayana Rao as Sumathi
Sri Vidya as Sumathi's wife
Thyagaraju as Thyagaiah
Eswar Rao as Eswar Rao
J.V. Ramana Murthi as S.P. Ramana Murthi
Suryakantham as Lingayya's wife
Jaya Malini
Dubbing Janaki as Jyothi's mother
Chalapathi Rao as Chalapathi
Mada as M.V. Rao
Chitti Babu as Constable
P.J. Sarma as Judge

Soundtrack
Soundtrack was composed by Chellapilla Satyam and lyrics were written by C. Narayana Reddy and Dasari Narayana Rao.
"Nene Ugra" - S. P. Balasubrahmanyam
"Dishum" - S. P. Balasubrahmanyam, P. Susheela
"Veyyi Kannulu" - K. J. Yesudas, P. Susheela
"Chana Undappa" - P. Susheela

References

1986 films
1980s Telugu-language films
1980s action drama films
Films directed by Dasari Narayana Rao
Films scored by Satyam (composer)
Indian action drama films
1986 drama films